François Marcellin Certain de Canrobert (born François Certain Canrobert; 27 June 1809 – 28 January 1895) was a French Marshal. He demonstrated ability during the Second French Empire while participating in the Battle of Alma, the Battle of Magenta, the Battle of Solferino and the Battle of Gravelotte. A staunch supporter of Napoleon III, he became, under the French Third Republic, one of the leading figures in the Bonapartist party and chairman, from 1876 to 1894, of the Senate within the French parliamentary group "Call upon the people".

Biography

Family background 
François Certain de Canrobert was born in Saint-Céré in Lot, where a statue (1897) in his effigy was erected in place de la République due to Alfred Lenoir.

At his birth, his father, Antoine Certain Canrobert, a former captain, was already 55 years old. This officer of the Ancien Regime had emigrated in 1791 and served against the French republic in the Armée de Condé. His half-brother, Antoine, a brilliant officer and graduate of  Saint-Cyr, was killed by a cannonball at the Battle of Ligny on 16 June 1815, while fighting for Emperor Napoleon I.

Through his father’s sister, Marie-Louise, François Certain de Canrobert was the cousin of  Adolphe and  Marcellin Marbot, who became respectively maréchal de camp (général de brigade) and lieutenant-général (général de division) during the July Monarchy of 1830–1848.

Early military career 
On 19 November 1826, aged 17, Canrobert entered the École Royale spéciale militaire de Saint-Cyr where he was designated as a  caporal (corporal) on 18 May 1828. At his graduation, he was posted to the 47th Line Infantry Regiment (RIL), with the rank of  Sous-lieutenant starting 1 October. He served until 1840 and was promoted to lieutenant on 20 January 1832.

North Africa 
In 1835 he arrived with his unit in Algeria, where he engaged in combat on the edges of Oued Sig and Habra. In 1836 he fought in actions at Dar el Achen, Tafna, Sidi Yacoub, La Silal and Bet el Laham.

He was designated as Lieutenant Adjudant Major on 28 September 1836. On 26 April 1837 he was promoted to captain and occupied the function of Captain Adjudant Major. He took part in the combat of Medjeoly-Amar and the Siege of Constantine where, as an assistant to colonel Michel Combes, he was wounded; at the age of 27, Canrobert earned the Knight Cross of the Legion d'honneur.

He was assigned to the 6th Chasseurs Battalion à Pied, on 17 October 1840. He took part in the battle of col de Mouzaïa in 1840. In the following year, he participated in actions at de Nador, de Moursia and confronted the Flittas. Designated as chef de bataillon (commandant – major) on 22 May 1842, he joined the 13th Light Infantry Regiment. On 16 October he transferred to the 5th Chasseurs Battalion à Pied, where he gained the Officer Order of the Legion d'honneur while demonstrating combat capability at Gontas, Baal, Tadjena, Battle of Sidi Brahim, then near Oued Lemig, during the combat  Isly and at Riou.

Promoted lieutenant-colonel on 26 October 1845, he was assigned to the 16th Line Infantry Regiment on 4 September. On 8 June 1847 he was assigned to the 2nd Line Infantry Regiment and commanded the subdivision of Batna.

Transfer to the Legion 
Promoted to colonel, on 8 November, he was assigned to the 78th Line Infantry Regiment, which he left on 31 March 1848 to take up the functions of regimental commander of the 2nd Foreign Legion Regiment 2ème R.E.L.E, while simultaneously maintaining the subdivision of Batna. With this unit, he took on Ahmed Bey.

In June he substituted for colonel Jean-François de Cariés de Senilhes and took command of the 3rd Zouaves Regiment and the subdivision of Sour El-Ghozlane. In 1849 he was in Beni Mélikech, Sameur, Al Amri. Then he commanded at the battle of Zaatcha, earning the Commander Neck Order of the Legion d'honneur on 10 December.

General of the Second Empire 

Recalled to France by the Prince-President  Louis-Napoléon Bonaparte, he was designated as maréchal de camp (général de brigade) starting 12 January 1850. He was nominated as commandant of the infantry brigade of the 1st Division of Paris, on 8 March 1850, then to the command of the 3rd Brigade on 9 February 1851; he contributed to the success in Paris of the French coup d'état of 1851. In the afternoon of 4 December 1851, on the Boulevards Montmarte and Poissonnière, the soldiers of the Division commanded by Canrobert came into contact with a crowd formed of the curious and protestors. In a certain confusion, the soldiers opened fire, causing 100–300 deaths and hundreds of wounded. On the night of 4 December the Parisian resistance to the coup collapsed, with 300 to 400 civilians killed. While two-thirds of the protestors comprised workers, amongst them also featured the innocent and curious, victims of the division of Canrobert on the grand boulevards. In all France, 26,884 people were arrested, essentially in the South-East, the South-West and a couple of departments in the Center. Almost 21,000 people were condemned by mixed commissions (composed in each department by prefects, a general, and a magistrate) out of which 9,530 ended in transportation to Algeria and 239 were sent to Cayenne in  Guiana. On the other hand and quite quickly, all pronounced repression measures declared by the 82 mixed commissions worried President  Louis-Napoléon Bonaparte,<ref>Pierre Milza, Napoléon III', Perrin, 2006, p.268</ref> who delegated in extraordinary mission, generals Canrobert,  Espinasse, and State Council Quentin Bauchart, in order to revise the arrest decisions taken and to prepare acts of grâce (forgiving the condemned by mercy). Espinasse and Canrobert, placed in charge of the South-West and Languedoc, showed little indulgence towards the condemned, they both accorded a little more than a thousand acts of forgiveness, while State Counselor Quentin-Bauchart, charged with the South-East, accorded alone 3,400 forgiveness sentences, while Louis-Napoléon Bonaparte in his own right forgave numerous condemnations.

Following these events Canrobert gained the function of aide de camp to the Prince-President, and later to the Emperor. Promoted Général de division on 14 January 1853, he commanded the infantry division at camp Helfaut-Saint Omer, as of 27 April. In May he became the inspector general of the 5th Infantry Arrondissement for the year 1853 before being designated to the infantry division of the  Orient Army on 23 February 1854.

 Crimea 
As  Général de division, he participated to the Crimean War of 1853–1856 and became commander in chief after Marshal  Saint-Arnaud, who died in September 1854. He took part in action at Dobruja (July 1854) and in the Battle of Alma (20 September 1854), where he was slightly wounded. He was elevated to the Grand Officer Order of the Legion d'honneur on 1 October. Present at the Battle of Balaclava (25 October 1854) and the Battle of Inkerman, he was wounded during the course of the latter, on 5 November 1854. He was accordingly promoted to the Order of the  Grand-Croix of the Légion d'honneur. On 13 January 1855, he received the Medaille Militaire.

Judged too timorous, he was relieved by general Aimable Pélissier (16 May 1855). He accordingly reassumed command of his former division, which became the 1st Infantry Division of the 2nd Corps. This situation having become difficult, Napoleon III insisted that Canrobert return to France. After several refusals, in August 1855 Canrobert returned to Paris to take up his functions as aide de camp.

His disputes with Lord Raglan, general of the British Army, obliged him to relinquish his command. On 18 March 1856, he was elevated to the dignity of Marshal of France.

 Italy 

In February 1858 he commanded the division of the East at Nancy, then the Camp de Châlons, starting from 1 June 1858. On 22 April 1859 he received the command of the 3rd Army Corps of the Alpes and participated in the campaign of Italy from April to July, passing by Turin, Dorial, Balba, Magenta and Solferino. He distinguished himself during the Battle of Magenta (4 June 1859) and was a major contributor to the victory at the Battle of Solferino on 24 June 1859.

 France 

He then joined the garrison at Nancy with his army corps. He became commandant of the 3rd Military Arrondissement at Nancy, on 27 August. In 1862 he commanded the troops of the Camp de Châlons, then took command of the 4th Army Corps at Lyon, starting in October. On 22 June 1856 he commanded the 1st Army Corps of the 1st Military Division of Paris.

 1870–1871 
Following the outbreak of the Franco-Prussian War on 19 July 1870, on 12 August 1870, Canrobert declined to take command of the Army of the Rhine, petrified by the responsibilities which would ensue. Abandoning the post to  Bazaine, Canrobert became an obedient subordinate. He took part in the battles of  Sainte-Barbe, Noisseville and  Landonchamps. On 16/18 August, he commanded the 6th Army Corps and demonstrated distinguished capability at  Saint-Privat where he shook three corps of Général von Steinmetz and decimated the 1st Infantry Regiment of the Prussian Guard. However, due to a mistake in the supply of ammunition and reinforcements, he abandoned his position. He was made prisoner – with Marshal Bazaine – during the  surrender of Metz on 28 October 1870. Following several months in captivity, he was liberated and returned to France in March 1871.

 End of his military career and political career 

He was then named President of the infantry promotion commission, a member of the Conseil supérieur de la guerre in 1872, and a member of the defense committee in 1873. He led a political career in the Bonapartist "Call upon the people" group, being elected Senator for Lot in 1876 and for Charente in 1879, a function which he held until 1894. His senate colleague Victor Hugo would not be tender for him: J'ai vu Canrobert au Sénat. Caboche de reître. Méchant, mais bête (Victor Hugo: "I saw Canrobert in the Senate. Roughneck soldier's head. Mean, but thick).

Close to President-Marshal Duke de Mac Mahon, he voted for the June 1877 dissolution of the Chamber and supported the short-lived Government of Albert de Broglie. In 1873, he represented the French Government at the funeral of King Victor Emmanuel II. A well-known figure of the Bonapartist Party, his participation in the political debates was mainly focused on military issues. He generally voted on the conservative side, most notably against bills on education, against judicial reforms, against the expulsion of the princes and against divorce, abstaining on the return to voting by district and on the press freedom restriction bill.Doyen of the Marshals of France of his time, he attended the funeral of President-Marshal Duke de Mac-Mahon and was saluted by Russian Admiral Avellane on behalf of the Russian Emperor. This was his last public official appearance. He died in his Parisian home, on 28 January 1895. His funeral was celebrated on Sunday, 3 February 1895, at the Church of Saint-Louis-des-Invalides where he was buried. Amiral Henri Rieunier, Ministère de la Marine, was designated to hold one of the five cordons of the funeral chariot.

He owned the Eglantine Castle in Jouy-en-Josas, which since 1991 houses the Musée de la toile de Jouy.

 Honors and posterity 

The name of Canrobert was given to:
 From 1872 to 1956, the village of Ange-Gardien, in the comté de Rouville, in Quebec; a rang of the municipality commemorates still the Battle of Magenta, where he distinguished himself;
 A garrison at Pontoise, then the area lot of the Pontoise station and the street that serves it;
 The place in the village of Saint-Privat-la-Montagne, near the cemetery in which the battle took place;
 A city in the Constantine Department created in 1904, today Oum El Bouaghi Province;
 The garrison of the 42nd Transmission Regiment at Rastatt in Germany;
 A road in the commune of Nœux-les-Mines, Pas-de-Calais;
 Support point Canrobert / Horimont-Stellung (1912–1916), north of the Group Fortification Lorraine.

 Decorations 

  Kingdom of France:
 Knight of the Légion d'honneur, 1837; Officer, 1843; Commander, 1849; Grand Officer, 1854; Grand Cross, 1855 Médaille militaire (citation: the jewel of the Army)
 Commemorative medal of the 1859 Italian Campaign
 :
 Honorary Grand Cross of the Order of the Bath (military division), 5 September 1855 Crimea Medal
   Sweden-Norway: Knight of the Order of the Seraphim, 17 November 1855 : Knight of the Order of the Elephant, 28 November 1855  Kingdom of Sardinia:
 Knight of the Supreme Order of the Most Holy Annunciation, 5 August 1857 Grand-Croix of the Military Order of Savoy, 16 November 1857 Sardinian Cross of Military Valor (1860)
  Kingdom of Prussia: Knight of the Order of the Black Eagle, 12 June 1867 : Order of the Medjidie, 1st Class
 : Knight of the Order of St. Andrew

 See also 
 Origins of the French Foreign Legion

 Marie Louis Henry de Granet-Lacroix de Chabrières
 Jean-Luc Carbuccia

 Notes 

 Further reading 

 
 Germain Bapst, Le Maréchal Canrobert. Souvenirs d'un siècle'' (Marshal Canrobert. Souvenir of a century), Paris, Plon, 1899, 1902, 1904.

1809 births
1895 deaths
People from Lot (department)
École Spéciale Militaire de Saint-Cyr alumni
Marshals of France
French military personnel of the Crimean War
French military personnel of the Franco-Prussian War
Officers of the French Foreign Legion
Grand Croix of the Légion d'honneur
Honorary Knights Grand Cross of the Order of the Bath
Military governors of Paris
Senators of Charente